Robert Walter Scott (July 24, 1861 – May 16, 1929) was an American farmer and politician. He was the father of W. Kerr and Ralph H. Scott and the grandfather and namesake of Robert W. Scott.

References

External links

1861 births
1929 deaths
Farmers from North Carolina
North Carolina Democrats
People from Alamance County, North Carolina
19th-century American politicians
20th-century American politicians
Robert W. (1861-1929)